Ambrosia grayi, the woollyleaf bur ragweed, is a North American species of plants in the family Asteraceae. It is native to the west-central part of the Great Plains of the United States, in the states of Nebraska, Kansas, Colorado, New Mexico, Oklahoma, and Texas.

Ambrosia grayi is a perennial herb up to 30 cm (12 inches) tall. Leaves are elliptical or egg-shaped. Flower heads are small and inconspicuous, as the plant is wind-pollinated. The heads develop into spiny burs as the seeds ripen.

References

External links
Goodwell and Texhoma, Oklahoma Pasture and Roadside Plants;  Ambrosia grayi Bur ragweed
Pollen Library
Department of Horticulture and Crop Science The Ohio State University, Seed Identification Workshop

grayi
Plants described in 1849
Flora of the Great Plains (North America)